The Cape St. George Light is a  high brick lighthouse which had originally stood for 153 years on St. George Island, Florida, until toppling into the Gulf of Mexico October 22, 2005.  The pieces of the lighthouse were retrieved, and in April 2008, the light's restoration was completed.

History

The first lighthouse on St. George Island was erected in 1833 near the island's western tip. It marked the narrow entrance to Apalachicola Bay at West Pass between St. George Island and St. Vincent Island. At the time, Apalachicola was an important cotton port.

Due to the sharp convex bend of St. George Island's southern coast at Cape St. George, southeast of the light, ships approaching from the eastern Gulf could not easily see it. Materials from the old tower were used in the construction of the new tower in 1847–48. A hurricane in the fall of 1850 undermined it, and the fourth hurricane of the 1851 Atlantic hurricane season toppled the tower in August of that year. The nearby lighthouses at Cape San Blas and Dog Island were destroyed by the same hurricane, and Apalachicola was heavily damaged.

It was lit with a third-order Fresnel lens that was visible (given its elevation above sea level) to a shipboard observer up to  out to sea.

As with other lights that came under Confederate control during the Civil War, the lens and other components of the Cape St. George Light were protectively removed, first to Apalachicola, then further inland. Union naval forces captured Apalachicola in April 1862, but the light remained dark. The lens was found at the end of the war and reinstalled. The lens had been damaged, resulting in a "dark angle", and was replaced in 1899. A tropical storm damaged the tower and the other buildings in 1878.

The power source was converted to mineral oil in 1882, and to incandescent oil vapor in 1913. The light was automated in 1949. In 1994 the Coast Guard removed the light from the lantern room and decommissioned the lighthouse.

In 1995 Hurricane Opal washed away much of the sand around the tower, shifted it partially off its pilings and rotated it, leaving it leaning about 10° from vertical. In 1998 the tower was further damaged by Hurricane Georges. Supporters raised $50,000 locally and $160,000 from the state to correct the tilt. The tower was righted and a new foundation built under it in 2002. However, the base was still exposed to surf, and the new foundation began deteriorating. The tower collapsed on October 22, 2005.

Reconstruction

Island volunteers formed the St. George Light Association to reconstruct the lighthouse on a more protected site. A salvage company retrieved 24,000 of the structure's 160,000 bricks from the water, and volunteers cleaned them. The Association won grants of $525,000 from federal and state sources, and rebuilt the lighthouse in a county park in the middle of St. George Island.  Local contractors provided construction services at reduced rates. The salvaged bricks were used in the interior lining of the conical tower. In April 2008, the restored lantern room was placed on top.  The completed reconstruction was opened to the public on November 29.

Head keepers

 John W. Smith (1834)
 Allen Smith (1834–1835)
 John Garrison (1835)
 Willis Nichols (1835–1841)
 Saunders J. Nichols (1841)
 Samuel Parker (1841–1842)
 David Adkins (1842–1846)
 William McKeon (1846–1848)
 Francis Lee (1848–1849)
 William H. Taylor (1849–1850)
 William Austin (1850–1854)
 Braddock Williams (1854–1861)
 James Reilly (1866–1867)
 Joseph Lucroft (1867–1868)
 Braddock Williams (1868–1874)
 Arad L. Williams (1874–1875)
 James A. Williams (1875–1893)
 Edward G. Porter (1893–1913)
 John F. Reese (1913–1917)
 David D. Silva (1917–1921)
 Walter A. Roberts, Jr. (1921)
 Clairmon Brooks (1921–1925)
 David D. Silva (1925–1932)
 Walter Andrew Roberts, Jr. (1932–1938)
 Thorton K. Cooper (1938–1939)
 Sullivan R. White (1939–1946)

Gallery

See also

 List of lighthouses in Florida
 List of lighthouses in the United States

Notes

References

McCarthy, Kevin M. (1990). Florida Lighthouses, Paintings by William L. Trotter, Gainesville, Florida: University of Florida Press. .
National Park Service Inventory of Historic Light Stations - Florida Lighthouses  - retrieved February 5, 2006

External links

 
 

Lighthouses completed in 1852
Buildings and structures demolished in 2005
Lighthouses on the National Register of Historic Places in Florida
Transportation buildings and structures in Franklin County, Florida
Historic American Buildings Survey in Florida
1852 establishments in Florida
National Register of Historic Places in Franklin County, Florida